Ramani Suryakantham Durvasula is an American clinical psychologist, professor of psychology, media expert, and author. She has appeared on media outlets discussing narcissistic personality disorder and narcissistic abuse, including Red Table Talk, Bravo, the Lifetime Movie Network, National Geographic, and the History Channel, as well programs such as the TODAY show and Good Morning America.

Early life
Ramani Suryakantham Durvasula was born in Englewood, New Jersey.

Education
In 1989, Durvasula obtained a Bachelor of Science in Psychology from the University of Connecticut. She has also received a Master of Arts in Psychology and a Doctor of Philosophy in Clinical Psychology from the University of California, Los Angeles (UCLA) in 1997.

Career
She has a private practice in Santa Monica and another in Sherman Oaks, Los Angeles.  She is also Professor of Psychology at California State University, and a Visiting Professor of Psychology at the University of Johannesburg. Her books include “Don’t You Know Who I Am”: How to Stay Sane in the Era of Narcissism, Entitlement and Incivility, Should I Stay or Should I Go: Surviving a Relationship With a Narcissist, and You Are WHY You Eat: Change Your Food Attitude, Change Your Life, as well as peer-reviewed journal articles, book chapters, and conference papers.

Durvasula first appeared on television on an episode of Remote Control. She was the co-host of the show My Shopping Addiction on the Oxygen network, and has provided commentary on the TODAY show and Good Morning America. Channels such as Bravo, the Lifetime Movie Network, National Geographic, the History Channel, Discovery Science, and Investigation Discovery have also featured her. In the Fall of 2010, she appeare in the Bravo series “Thintervention,” where she led group therapy sessions to help six participants find out the source of their overeating. She is co-host of the podcast Sexual Disorientation. She has been interviewed on internet media platforms as well, notably MedCircle and TONE Network. She has spoken at TEDx Sedona and South by Southwest. At the American Psychological Association, she was on the Committee on Socioeconomic Status from 2014–2017 (serving as president in 2016), and is a member of the Advisory Board of the Minority Fellowship Program.  The National Institutes of Health has funded her research on personality disorders; they approved a $1.5 million grant for her to study the link between HIV and mental illness. The four-year study, that included 288 patients, determined that 92-percent of participants had experienced depression, substance use disorder or another Axis-I disorder, and that nearly half met criteria for at least one Axis-II disorder (e.g. antisocial personality disorder, borderline personality disorder, or narcissistic personality disorder).

Accolades
In 2003, Durvasula received the “Emerging Scholar” Award from the American Association of University Women and the “Distinguished Woman” Award from the CSULA. California State University named her Outstanding Professor of the year in 2012.

Personal life
Durvasula lives in Los Angeles. She has indicated she is a single mother.

Filmography
Thintervention (2010)
Ted Talk (2018) – "Narcissism and Its Discontents" (Guest)
Red Table Talk (2019) – "The Narcissism Epidemic" (Guest)
The Today Show (2020) – "How to Prepare for a Healthy Divorce" (Guest)
The Today Show (2020) – "Relationship Expert Offers Advice to Couples in Quarantine" (Guest)
Red Table Talk (2020) – "Managing Our Anxiety & Fear During COVID-19" (Guest)
Oxygen's Snapped (2020) – "Notorious: Hollywood Ripper" (Guest)

Podcasts

Sexual Disorientation with Dr. Ramani (2017–present) (Host)
The Psych Central Show – (2018) "Why Does the Narcissist Always Get the Girl?" (Guest)
The Psych Central Show – (2018) "Help! My Coworker Is a Narcissist!" (Guest)
LAHWF (2018) – "Chatting with an Expert on Narcissism"
 Being Well with Dr. Rick Hanson (2019) – "How to Deal with a Narcissist" (Guest)
Speaking of Psychology (2019) – "Recognizing a Narcissist" (Guest)
Progress Notes (2019) "Sharing Your Expertise in the Media" (Guest)
Mental Illness Happy Hour with Paul Gilmartin (2019) "Narcissists and Psychopaths" (Guest)
On Purpose with Jay Shetty (2020) – "How To Cope With Feelings Of Uncertainty & Grief During A Pandemic" (Guest)
H.E.R. Space Podcast (2020) – "Raised By A Narcissist: Signs, Symptoms, and How to Recover" (Guest)
Teddi Tea Pod With Teddi Mellencamp (2020) – "Don’t Fall In Love with a Narcissist" (Guest)
Negotiate Your Best Life (2020) – "Do's and Don'ts of Negotiating with a Narcissist" (Guest)
Cleaning Up the Mental Mess (2020) — "Navigating Narcissistic Relationships, How the Culture of Entitlement is Making the Pandemic Worse + Why We Are So Interested in Stories About Psychopaths with Psychologist Dr. Ramani Durvasula" (Guest)
Zestology (2020) — "Dr. Ramani Durvasala on Narcissism #292" (Guest)

Bibliography

Papers

Books
You Are WHY You Eat: Change Your Food Attitude, Change Your Life (January 1, 2013)
Should I Stay or Should I Go: Surviving A Relationship with a Narcissist (October 24, 2017)
Mothers, Daughters, and Body Image: Learning to Love Ourselves as We Are (October 31, 2017) – with Hillary L. McBride
Don’t You Know Who I Am: Staying Sane in an Era of Narcissism, Entitlement and Incivility (2019)

References

Works cited

External links

Doctor-Ramani.com, Official Website

Dr. Ramani Durvasula on Instagram
A Guide to Better Relationships, her essays for Psychology Today

1965 births
Living people
American clinical psychologists
People from Englewood, New Jersey
California State University, Los Angeles faculty